The second season of the American comedy television series Scrubs premiered on NBC on September 26, 2002, and concluded on April 17, 2003, and consists of 22 episodes. For the second season Neil Flynn was made a series regular. Colin Hay guest starred for the first time. It is also the first time an episode gives the narration to another regular, in "His Story".

The show used a longer opening credits sequence for episodes 1 and 2, moving through the ward rather than just two beds, including a shot of Flynn as The Janitor, showing the names of the series regulars and ending with the chest X-ray showing the heart on the left side of the chest.  NBC wanted longer content in the episodes so the credits permanently returned to the shorter version in episode 3, without Flynn nor actors names and with the mirror image chest X-ray.

The second season focuses on Dr. John Dorian's second year practicing medicine at Sacred Heart, where he is now a resident. In the season opener, everyone is still in shock from the secrets Jordan just revealed ("My Last Day"). As the season develops, J.D.'s older brother Dan (Tom Cavanagh) comes to visit, money issues affect J.D., Elliot, and Turk, Turk proposes to Carla, and Elliot finds a new boyfriend, a nurse named Paul Flowers (Rick Schroder). Dr. Cox resumes a sexual relationship with his ex-wife Jordan, with quite unexpected results.

Cast and characters

Main cast
Zach Braff as Dr. John "J.D." Dorian
Sarah Chalke as Dr. Elliot Reid
Donald Faison as Dr. Chris Turk
Neil Flynn as The Janitor
Ken Jenkins as Dr. Bob Kelso
John C. McGinley as Dr. Perry Cox
Judy Reyes as Nurse Carla Espinosa

Recurring roles
Aloma Wright as Nurse Laverne Roberts
Robert Maschio as Dr. Todd Quinlan
Sam Lloyd as Ted Buckland
Christa Miller as Jordan Sullivan
Johnny Kastl as Dr. Doug Murphy
Charles Chun as Dr. Phillip Wen

Guest stars
Rick Schroder as Paul Flowers
Amy Smart as Jamie Moyer
Heather Locklear as Julie Keaton
Masi Oka as Franklyn (MT)
Tom Cavanagh as Dan Dorian
D. L. Hughley as  Kevin Turk
Richard Kind as Harvey Corman
Michael McDonald as Mike Davis
Jay Mohr as Dr. Peter Fisher
John Ritter as Sam Dorian
Ryan Reynolds as Spence
Alan Ruck as Mr. Bragin
Dick Van Dyke as Dr. Doug Townshend
The Blanks as the Worthless Peons

Production
Tim Hobert was added as a consulting producer. Angela Nissel was hired as a staff writer for this season. April Pesa, the script coordinator, was given the chance to write an episode. Bonnie Sikotwiz (credited as Bonnine Schneider) & Hadley Davis, who Lawrence knew through Spin City, came into write an episode this season.

Writing staff
Bill Lawrence – executive producer/head writer
Eric Weinberg – co-executive producer
Matt Tarses – co-executive producer
Tim Hobert – consulting producer (episodes 1–13) / co-executive producer (episodes 14–22)
Neil Goldman and Garrett Donovan – producers
Gabrielle Allan – producer
Mike Schwartz – executive story editor
Debra Fordham – story editor
Mark Stegemann – story editor
Janae Bakken – story editor
Angela Nissel – staff writer

Production staff
Bill Lawrence – executive producer/showrunner
Randall Winston – producer
Liz Newman – co-producer
Danny Rose – associate producer

Directors
Includes directors who directed 2 or more episodes, or directors who are part of the cast and crew
Michael Spiller (4 episodes)
Marc Buckland (3 episodes)
Adam Bernstein (2 episodes)
Lawrence Trilling (2 episodes)
Chris Koch (2 episodes)
Ken Whittingham (2 episodes)
Will Mackenzie (2 episodes)
Bill Lawrence (1 episode)

Episodes

Notes 
† denotes a "supersized" episode, running an extended length of 25–28 minutes.

References

General references

External links

 

 
2002 American television seasons
2003 American television seasons
2